Theodore Cole or Ted Cole may refer to:

Ted Cole, voice actor
Theodore Cole (convict), criminal who attempted to escape from Alcatraz Federal Penitentiary
Ted Cole, character in Rising Sun (Crichton novel)

See also
Edward Cole (disambiguation)